is a Shinto shrine in Wakkanai, Hokkaidō, Japan. In 1896 the shrine was transferred to its current location and renamed Hokumon Jinja, with Takemikazuchi and Kotoshironushi enshrined alongside Amaterasu. In 1902 work on the shrine buildings was completed, but on 17 May 1911 the whole complex was destroyed by a wild fire. The year 1913 saw the rebuilding of the honden and haiden and in 1916 Hokuman Jinja was ranked as a Village Shrine. In 1925 the shrine offices were donated and in 1933 Hokumon Jinja was promoted to the rank of District Shrine. The hexagonal shrine mikoshi was dedicated in 1949 and in 1978 the new shrine building was completed and a transfer ceremony held.

See also
 List of Shinto shrines
 Modern system of ranked Shinto Shrines

References

External links

Hokumon Jinja 

Wakkanai, Hokkaido
Shinto shrines in Hokkaido
1780s establishments in Japan
Religious organizations established in 1785